MV Nova Star is a Ropax cruiseferry, currently operating between Poland and Scandinavia under the ownership of Polferries.

Construction and service history
The vessel was built by ST Marine in Singapore for LD Lines, which signed a $179 million contract for the vessel in 2007. She was intended to operate in the English Channel, but her contract was canceled in 2011 before she could take her maiden voyage to France.

Initially named Norman Leader, the vessel remained under the ownership of her builder, ST Marine, until being acquired by Nova Star Cruises in 2014 and renamed MV Nova Star for the Gulf of Maine service. She ran seasonal operations between Portland, Maine and Yarmouth, Nova Scotia under Nova Star Cruises for two seasons. Following the decision not to renew Nova Star Cruises' license to operate the service at the end of the 2015 season, Nova Star Cruises subsequently closed and Gulf of Maine operations were taken over by Bay Ferries, which has previously operated ferries in the region prior to Nova Star Cruises.

Once her Gulf of Maine service ended, Nova Star was purchased by the Moroccan company Inter Shipping. Following her arrival in Algeciras in February 2016, it was made apparent that Nova Star'''s bow ramp was too short to operate the service, therefore delaying her entry into service. She eventually began operating between Algeciras, Spain and Tangier, Morocco under the ownership and operation of Inter Shipping. She ran this route until 2018, when she was then purchased by Polferries, who currently operate her on the route between Poland and Scandinavia.

Vessel detailsNova Star'' is an average-sized cruiseferry. Its dimensions are  length by  width.

The ship features a large variety of cruise-ship like features, including two restaurants, three bars, a casino gaming facility, and a duty-free retail shop. The ship also includes a children play area, live on-board entertainment, a spa and art gallery.

The vessel has 163 cabins and a capacity of 1,215 passengers. She can carry 336 car-equivalents and/or 38 commercial vehicles (semi-trailer rigs or buses) and commensurately fewer cars.

References

External links
Nova Star Cruises (official website)

Cruiseferries
Ferries of Maine
Ferries of Nova Scotia
2009 ships
Ships built in Singapore